Brandel Eugene Chamblee (born July 2, 1962) is a former American professional golfer, commentator and writer.

Chamblee was born in St. Louis, Missouri. He graduated from the University of Texas with a degree in Speech Communication and was a first-team All-American in his junior year and twice a second-team All-American. He has a home in Phoenix, Arizona and has four children with his ex-wife Karen: sons Brandel Jr., Brennen, Braeden, and a daughter, Bergen. A memorial playground was set up at the Phoenix Children's Hospital for a son, Braeden, who died as an infant. He is now married to Bailey (Mosier) Chamblee, who is also a television personality. Chamblee was inducted into the Irving Independent School District Hall of Fame Class of 2014.

Chamblee turned professional in 1985 and has one PGA Tour victory. He shared a first round lead at the 1999 Masters Tournament and for seven consecutive years (1995–2001) was among the top-100 for money earnings on the Tour.

Chamblee lost his PGA Tour card in 2003, and since then has worked as the lead studio analyst for the Golf Channel, Golf Central and for its "Live From" coverage of major championships.

In 2018, Chamblee returned to professional golf on the PGA Tour Champions.

Amateur wins
1983 Rice Planters Amateur

Professional wins (4)

PGA Tour wins (1)

PGA Tour playoff record (0–2)

Ben Hogan Tour wins (1)

Other wins (2)
1986 TPA Tucson Open
1994 Abierto International Open (Chile)

Results in major championships

CUT = missed the half-way cut
"T" = tied

See also
1987 PGA Tour Qualifying School graduates
1990 PGA Tour Qualifying School graduates
1991 PGA Tour Qualifying School graduates
1992 PGA Tour Qualifying School graduates

References

External links

Profile on the Golf Channel site

American male golfers
Texas Longhorns men's golfers
PGA Tour golfers
Golf writers and broadcasters
Golfers from St. Louis
Golfers from Phoenix, Arizona
1962 births
Living people